Snake in the Grass is an American reality competition series broadcast on USA Network and hosted by Bobby Bones. Each episode features four contestants working together to complete challenges to win clues about the identity of the "Snake", a hidden saboteur within the group. At the end of each episode, the contestants vote for who they believe the Snake is and split a $100,000 prize if they successfully find the Snake, otherwise the Snake receives the prize money. 

A special preview episode aired on July 26, 2022, on NBC, and the show officially premiered on USA Network on August 1 of the same year. On March 1, 2023, USA Network canceled the series.

Format
Each episode features a group of four players working together to complete a series of challenges. One of them has been secretly designated as the "Snake" and may attempt to sabotage the group's efforts while remaining undetected. At the start of the episode, host Bobby Bones meets with the group and gives them one clue to the Snake's identity. The group then attempts a challenge; completing it within a given time limit awards a second clue. Afterwards, the group spends the night at a campsite where they have the chance to find a third clue hidden in the area.

The following day, the group participates in a second challenge, receiving a fourth and final clue if they succeed. At the end of the day, the group meets at the "Snake Pit" where they discuss their thoughts on the Snake's identity. Each contestant then casts one vote as to who they believe the Snake is. If the three honest contestants vote correctly, they split $100,000 and the Snake receives nothing; if not, the Snake wins the entire prize.

Contestants
The contestants were revealed on June 23, 2022. They include: Big Brother alumni Janelle Pierzina and Rachel Reilly; Survivor alumni Cirie Fields, Earl Cole, Malcolm Freberg, Stephenie LaGrossa Kendrick, Trish Hegarty and Yul Kwon;  UFC; Heavyweight fighter Todd Duffee, Naked and Afraid alumni Jeff Zausch and Lacey Jones; track and field athlete Alysia Montaño and Miss Massachusetts 2016 Alissa Musto.

Episodes

References

External links

English-language television shows
USA Network original programming
2020s American reality television series
2022 American television series debuts
2022 American television series endings
Reality competition television series
Television series by Entertainment One
Television shows filmed in Costa Rica
Television shows set in Costa Rica